The discography of American singer-songwriter Khalid consists of two studio albums, one mixtape, one extended play, and 42 singles (including 15 as a featured artist).

On March 3, 2017, Khalid released his debut studio album, American Teen. The album debuted and peaked at number four on the Billboard 200. It produced the top-20 singles, "Location" and "Young Dumb & Broke", which reached numbers 16 and 18 on the Billboard Hot 100, respectively. In 2018, he released a collaboration with Normani, "Love Lies", which reached number nine on the Hot 100. Later that year, he released a collaboration with Benny Blanco and Halsey, "Eastside", which also reached number nine on the Hot 100. On October 19, 2018, Khalid released his debut extended play, Suncity. The EP debuted and peaked at number eight on the Billboard 200. It produced the top-10 single, "Better", which charted at number eight on the Hot 100.

On April 5, 2019, Khalid released his second studio album, Free Spirit. The album debuted and peaked atop the Billboard 200, giving him his first chart-topping project. It produced the top-10 single, "Talk", which reached number three on the Billboard Hot 100. In 2020, he released a collaboration with Kane Brown and Swae Lee, "Be Like That", which reached number 19 on the Hot 100. On December 3, 2021, Khalid released his debut mixtape, Scenic Drive. The mixtape debuted and peaked at number 54 on the Billboard 200.

Khalid has also been featured on several songs that have received mainstream success. In 2017, he appeared alongside Alessia Cara on Logic's single, "1-800-273-8255", which reached number three on the Billboard Hot 100. Later that year, he was featured on Marshmello's single, "Silence", which charted at number 30 on the Hot 100. In 2019, he was featured on Ed Sheeran's single, "Beautiful People", which debuted and peaked at number 13 on the Hot 100.

Studio albums

Mixtapes

Extended plays

Singles

As lead artist

As featured artist

Promotional singles

Other charted and certified songs

Guest appearances

Music videos

Notes

References

Discographies of American artists
Contemporary R&B discographies
Pop music discographies